Daman District may refer to:
Daman District, Afghanistan
Daman District, India

District name disambiguation pages